Chalky Mount is a rugged picturesque range of hills in Saint Andrew, Barbados, forming a jagged profile against the horizon when viewed from the east coast - commonly called Napoleon's Head.

Chalky Mount has considerable clay deposits and is the home of the potteries, one of Barbados' most important cottage industries, established in the nineteenth century.

References

Landforms of Barbados